The Rowdy is a 1921 American silent drama film directed by David Kirkland and starring Rex De Rosselli, Anna Dodge and Gladys Walton.

Cast
 Rex De Rosselli as Capt. Dan Purcell
 Anna Dodge as Mrs. Purcell 
 Gladys Walton as Kit Purcell
 Charles Murphy as 	Pete Curry 
 Jack Mower as 	Burt Kincaid
 Frances Hatton as Mrs. Curry
 Bert Roach as Howard Morse
 Alida B. Jones as Beatrice Hampton
 Countess Du Cello as Clarissa Hampton 
 Barbara Maier as 	Little Girl

References

Bibliography
 Connelly, Robert B. The Silents: Silent Feature Films, 1910-36, Volume 40, Issue 2. December Press, 1998.
 Munden, Kenneth White. The American Film Institute Catalog of Motion Pictures Produced in the United States, Part 1. University of California Press, 1997.

External links
 

1921 films
1921 drama films
1920s English-language films
American silent feature films
Silent American drama films
Films directed by David Kirkland
American black-and-white films
Universal Pictures films
1920s American films
English-language drama films